The bearded eelgoby (Taenioides jacksoni),  also known as the bearded goby, is a species of goby endemic to South Africa where it inhabits muddy areas of mangrove swamps, estuaries and rivers.  This species can reach a length of  TL.

References

Taenioides
Freshwater fish of South Africa
Near threatened animals
Taxonomy articles created by Polbot
Taxa named by J. L. B. Smith
Fish described in 1943